Sally Tayler (born c. 1961), is an Australian actress known for several ongoing roles in Australian soap operas.

Biography
She played the key role of Dr. Vicki Daniels in The Young Doctors in 1982–83. After that series ended she starred in the short-lived soap opera Waterloo Station (1983). In 1985 she played Samantha Morrell in Sons and Daughters.

In the early 1980s she travelled to the United Kingdom to work, scoring a guest role playing Lisa, an Australian 'hoister', in a 1983 episode of Minder along with former "Young Doctors" and Waterloo Station co-star, Julianne White.

She is the daughter of The Young Doctors actress Lyn James, who played Helen Gordon in the show, and the New Zealand-born producer and director, Eric Tayler.

Filmography

FILM

TELEVISION

External links
 

Living people
Australian television actresses
Place of birth missing (living people)
Year of birth missing (living people)
Australian people of New Zealand descent
Australian people of Welsh descent